Flight Lieutenant Frank Gerald Craven Weare  (15 June 1896 – 6 July 1971) was a British World War I flying ace credited with fifteen aerial victories in forty days.

Early life and education
Weare was born in Southborough, Kent, the son of Frank and Mary L. Weare. His father ran the High Brooms Brick & Tile Company, which had been founded by his father, John Smith Weare, in 1885. In 1910 Weare was sent to Charterhouse School.

World War I service
Weare attended the Royal Military College, Sandhurst as a "Gentlemen Cadet", and on 20 October 1915 received a commission as a second lieutenant in the York and Lancaster Regiment. However, this was later cancelled, and Weare was commissioned into The Buffs (East Kent Regiment) instead.

In 1917 Weare was seconded to the Royal Flying Corps and, on completion of his basic flight training, was appointed a flying officer on 11 July. On 1 September 1917 he was transferred to the General List with the temporary rank of lieutenant while serving in the RFC. On 24 December 1917 he was promoted to lieutenant, with seniority from 1 July.

He was appointed a flight commander with the temporary rank of captain in No. 22 Squadron RFC on 11 March 1918. Flying a Bristol F.2b two-seater fighter Weare gained his first victory two days later, on 13 March, with Second Lieutenant S. J. Hunter as his observer. He and Hunter gained another victory on 16 March, before Weare was paired with Lieutenant George Hayward. By the end of the month Weare and Hayward had gained six more victories. On 1 April 1918, the Army's Royal Flying Corps (RFC) and the Royal Naval Air Service (RNAS) were merged to form the Royal Air Force and Weare's unit became No. 22 Squadron RAF. The next day Weare and Hayward destroyed two more enemy aircraft, then three on 12 April, and two more on the 22nd, bring Weare's total to 15, and Hayward's to 24.

Weare was awarded the Military Cross, which was gazetted on 21 June 1918. His citation read:
Lieutenant (Temporary Captain) Frank Gerald Craven Weare, East Kent Regiment and R.F.C.
"For conspicuous gallantry and devotion to duty. In the course of eight days' operations he destroyed two enemy machines, drove down one out of control and enabled his observer to destroy two others. During an earlier engagement he carried out two valuable reconnaissances at a low altitude. He showed a splendid fighting spirit and displayed great skill and judgment in leading his formation."

List of aerial victories

Post-war career
On 1 May 1919 Weare was again appointed a temporary captain, and on 1 August was granted a permanent commission in the Royal Air Force as a lieutenant, becoming a flying officer when the RAF adopted its own system of ranks soon after.

In July 1920, during the annual RAF Pageant, Weare took part in a cross-country race between six Avro 504 aircraft, taking an early lead, and eventually winning. On 1 January 1922 he was promoted to flight lieutenant.

On 6 August 1923 Weare was one of the sixteen competitors in the "Air League Challenge Cup", representing RAF Cranwell. Other entrants included Wing Commander J. T. Babington, representing RAF Andover, Flying Officer G. W. Hemming (RAF Farnborough), Flying Officer L. Hamilton (RAF Kenley), Wing Commander A. S. Barratt (RAF Spitalgate) and Air Commodore H. C. T. Dowding (RAF Northolt). The eventual winner was Flight Lieutenant H. S. Shield, of RAF Eastchurch, with Air Commodore Dowding second, and Flight Lieutenant E. B. Rice (RAF Halton) third.
 
On 30 January 1924 Weare resigned his RAF commission, but was permitted to retain his rank.

Weare had become engaged to Eleanor Rachel Cherry-Downes in November 1923, and they were married at St Paul's Church, Knightsbridge, on 30 April 1924. They would go on to have four children. Weare became a director of the High Brooms Brick & Tile Company, eventually taking control after the death of his father in 1941. The company was finally wound up in the 1960s.

References
Notes

Bibliography
 

1896 births
1971 deaths
People from Southborough, Kent
People educated at Charterhouse School
Graduates of the Royal Military College, Sandhurst
Buffs (Royal East Kent Regiment) officers
Royal Flying Corps officers
Royal Air Force officers
British World War I flying aces
Recipients of the Military Cross
Military personnel from Kent
British Army personnel of World War I